The Elton High School is a mixed secondary school located on Walshaw Road to the north-west of Bury town centre in Greater Manchester.

The Elton High School was recognised as "Good" school with "Outstanding" features by Ofsted following inspection in 2009. The English Department was inspected in November 2010 and it was found that the overall effectiveness of English within the school was "Outstanding". In February 2015, the school was graded "requires improvement" in all areas. The school was most recently graded "Good" following an Ofsted inspection in January 2017.

The original school building was opened in 1954. Construction of a new building on the same site began in summer 2015 and opened to pupils in September 2016. It was constructed as part of a nationwide plan to replace the schools in poorest condition.

Notable former pupils
Phil Neville, retired England international football player, former Everton captain, co-owner of Salford City and coach of Inter Miami
Gary Neville, Sky Sports football pundit, retired England international football player, former Manchester United captain and co-owner of Salford City
Tracey Neville, twin sister of Phil Neville, former England netball team coach
Steve Kirby, former Marylebone Cricket Club Head Coach
Matt Littler, actor best known for his role as Max Cunningham in Hollyoaks
Ian Hughes, former Bury and Blackpool football player
Georgia May Foote, actor who played Katy Armstrong in Coronation Street
Jazmine Franks, actor who played Esther Bloom in Hollyoaks

References

External links
 

Secondary schools in the Metropolitan Borough of Bury
Community schools in the Metropolitan Borough of Bury
Schools in Bury, Greater Manchester
Educational institutions established in 1954
1954 establishments in England